Vermillion Township is located in LaSalle County, Illinois. As of the 2010 census, its population was 387 and it contained 166 housing units.

Geography

Demographics

References

External links
US Census
City-data.com
Illinois State Archives

1849 establishments in Illinois
Populated places established in 1849
Townships in Illinois
Townships in LaSalle County, Illinois